Nesbitt, Thomson and Company was a Canadian stock brokerage firm that was founded in 1912 by Arthur J. Nesbitt and Peter A. T. Thomson. The firm was headquartered on St. James Street in Montreal, Quebec.

In 1987, Nesbitt Thomson was acquired by the Bank of Montreal, with Brian J. Steck appointed as President and CEO.

In 1994, the firm was merged with Burns Fry Ltd. to create the Nesbitt Burns Inc. entity now operating as BMO Capital Markets and BMO Nesbitt Burns, both wholly-owned subsidiaries of the Bank of Montreal Financial Group.

References

Financial services companies established in 1912
Stock brokerages and investment banks of Canada
Power Corporation of Canada
Defunct financial services companies of Canada
Companies based in Montreal
Financial services companies disestablished in 1994
Bank of Montreal
1912 establishments in Quebec
1994 disestablishments in Quebec
Canadian companies established in 1912